M. Ageyev was the pen name of the writer of the Russian Novel with Cocaine. He is believed to be Mark Lazarevich  Levi (August 8, 1898August 5, 1973).

Biography
His best-known work, Novel With Cocaine (also translated as the Cocain Romance), was published in 1934 in the Parisian émigré publication, Numbers.  Nikita Struve alleged it to be the work of another Russian author employing a pen name - Vladimir Nabokov; this idea was debunked by Nabokov's son Dmitri in his preface to "The Enchanter", where he claims Ageyev is Mark Levi. Levi's life is shrouded in mystery and conjecture.  He seems to have returned to the U.S.S.R. in 1942 and spent the rest of his life in Yerevan, where he died on August 5, 1973.

References 

 Kseniya Ragozina's article "Detektiv s romanom"

External links

1898 births
1973 deaths
Writers from Moscow
Russian Jews
Russian male novelists
Soviet novelists
Soviet male writers
20th-century Russian male writers
20th-century pseudonymous writers